Memorial City Mall is a large shopping mall in Houston, Texas, United States. The mall is in the Memorial City Management District, whose official legal name is the "Harris County Municipal Management District No. 1" under Chapter 3810 of the Texas Special District Local Laws Code. The mall is adjacent to the large Memorial Hermann Memorial City Medical Center. Constructed in the mid-1960s, the mall was renovated extensively in the early 2000s. It has since become one of the city's most popular malls. The anchor stores are American Girl, Old Navy, Sun & Ski Sports, Cinemark, JCPenney, Dillard's, Macy's, and Target. There is 1 vacant anchor store that was once Sears.

History

First mall

When the Memorial City Mall was completed in 1966, it was a middle-market shopping venue that included a Sears store as its first anchor. The Memorial Theater, which was a single-screen cinema in operation since June 1962, was connected with the interior of the mall. A Montgomery Ward store opened in 1972 as the mall's second anchor store. Foley's opened a store in 1974 in the mall's new East Wing. Lord & Taylor opened a store in 1977 in the western side of the mall. With these additions, the mall had  of leasable space.

Memorial City Mall was developed by MetroNational’s founder, Joseph Johnson.

Rivalry with Town & Country Mall
Town & Country Mall opened in 1983 at the intersection of Interstate 10 and Beltway 8, only one mile west of Memorial City Mall, The new mall featured more upscale stores, such as Neiman Marcus and Marshall Field and Company. For a time, the Town & Country Mall was considered more fashion-conscious.

To regain market share, Memorial City Mall underwent renovations and added "Fame City," which was a multi-faceted family entertainment complex with an indoor mini golf course, kiddie ride area, video game arcade, teen disco, roller skating rink, and an eight-screen Loew's Theatre. These attractions opened in 1989. The mall also began hosting specialty conventions for items such as model trains. Fame City was not successful, however, and the mall continued to decline. In 1989, Lord & Taylor closed its store and was replaced by a Mervyn's store.

Neiman Marcus announced in 1997 that it was moving its store from the Town & Country Mall to the Memorial City Mall. During the construction of the Sam Houston Tollway, the visibility of the Town & Country Mall declined and access became difficult. In addition, the 1980s oil glut had a severe impact on Houston's economy and marked the beginning of the end of Town & Country Mall. The mall became less popular with shoppers as its interior became dated and important tenants like  anchors Dillard's and JCPenney moved to the Memorial City Mall. Town & Country Mall closed in 2004 and was demolished shortly thereafter.

Revival
By the early 2000s, the area surrounding Memorial City Mall had returned to prosperity thanks to a US$500 million renovation project that took place from 2001 to 2005. During this period, over 100 retail shops were added to the complex, including five anchor stores.

In January 2001, Montgomery Ward closed its store. In November, Foley's moved into a larger, two-level store. Lord & Taylor returned to the mall in March 2002 with a two-level store. The eight-screen Loew's Theater closed in 2002 after its owner, Trammell Crow Co., filed for bankruptcy in early 2001.

In October 2003, an extended east concourse and a Dillard's store replaced Foley's original store, which had been demolished. Two parking garages were constructed as well. That same month, Target opened its newly constructed store on the site where the now-demolished Montgomery Ward store had stood. With the goal of "creating a total family experience", large-scale renovations of the mall continued through 2004 with the construction of a large  play area for children and a NHL-standard sized ice rink.

A new 16-screen Cinemark movie theater with stadium seating opened adjacent to Sears in May 2007.

In 2005, Lord & Taylor closed its anchor space, which JCPenney moved into in February 2006. Mervyn's stopped operating in Texas in 2006, and its mall store was demolished soon thereafter. During 2009 and 2010, a skyway was constructed across Gessner Road that connected the mall to a 267-room Westin hotel under construction next to the Memorial Hermann Memorial City Medical Center. The hotel opened in March 2011.

In 2015, Sears Holdings spun off 235 of its properties, including the Sears at Memorial City Mall, into Seritage Growth Properties.

On August 22, 2018, it was announced that Sears would be closing as part of a plan to close 46 stores nationwide. The store closed in November 2018. After the store closed, Target, Macy’s, Dillard’s and JCPenney are remaining anchors left.

Anchors
Dillard's
Forever 21
JCPenney (Lord & Taylor 2002-2005)
Macy's (Foley's 2001-2006)
Target

References

External links

 

Shopping malls in Houston
Shopping malls established in 1962